The Wilderness Act of 1964 was written by Howard Zahniser of The Wilderness Society. It created the legal definition of wilderness in the United States, and protected 9.1 million acres (37,000 km²) of federal land.  The result of a long effort to protect federal wilderness and to create a formal mechanism for designating wilderness, the Wilderness Act was signed into law by President Lyndon B. Johnson on September 3, 1964 after over sixty drafts and eight years of work.

The Wilderness Act is well known for its succinct and poetic definition of wilderness:

"A wilderness, in contrast with those areas where man and his own works dominate the landscape, is hereby recognized as an area where the earth and its community of life are untrammeled by man, where man himself is a visitor who does not remain." – Howard Zahniser

When Congress passed and President Lyndon B. Johnson signed the Wilderness Act on September 3, 1964, it created the National Wilderness Preservation System. The initial statutory wilderness areas, designated in the Act, comprised 9.1 million acres (37,000 km²) of national forest wilderness areas in the United States of America previously protected by administrative orders. The current amount of areas designated by the NWPS as wilderness totals 757 areas encompassing 109.5 million acres of federally owned land in 44 states and Puerto Rico (5% of the land in the United States).

Background 
Throughout the 1950s and 1960s there were growing concerns about the rapidly growing population in America after World War II, a period known as a baby boom. Additionally, American transportation systems grew in size which made transportation easier and increased environmental concerns. A leading concern was that environmental degradation would have an impact on air and water quality, this was partly addressed by the initial passage of the Clean Air Act in 1963.

The problem of American wilderness available still persisted even after attempts to regulate pollutants. Part of America's identity was its vast untamed wilderness that was untouched by humans, which had fallen to about 2.5% of the total land in America by the 1960s. Previous efforts to conserve the nature had yielded public land designations and protections such as the National Parks System, National Forests, and primitive areas. Unfortunately, many of these designations came short of providing the necessary protections needed to keep the land preserved for future generations. The shortcomings of previous protections was exclaimed by efforts to develop protected lands for mining and energy utilization, a prominent example is the Echo Park Dam controversy at Dinosaur National Monument. The encroachment on existing protected land motivated conservationist to lobby Congress to add additional protections to wilderness land, in particular Howard Zahniser wrote the first draft of the Wilderness Act.

Legislative history 
The Wilderness Act of 1964 went through numerous discussions and drafts before finally being enacted during the 88th Congressional Session.

Before the 88th Congress 
The concept of developing a federal Wilderness system through Congress began to be seriously explored when in 1948 a group of Congressional members requested a report be compiled on the topic through the Legislative Reference Service within the Library of Congress. The report was completed a year later, and the results released the data that had been requested which provided more information on the current state of federal land. In 1956, about seven years later, the first committee hearings began in House and Senate on the topic of protecting Wildlife Refuge areas. The first drafts of the Wilderness Act were introduced in the House in January of 1957, where 6 bills were introduced over a span of four days. One month later the Senate also introduced a draft bill of the Wilderness Act.

President John F. Kennedy was a supporter of the Wilderness Act, his administration worked to rally Legislators to pass the bill. During the 87th Congressional session the Senate voted and passed a version of the Wilderness Act, however it never made it to a vote in the House and its overall fate was regarded as uncertain at the time.

The 88th Congress 
Early in the 88th Congressional term the Senate debated and eventually passed the Wilderness Bill in April 1963. After President Kennedy's assassination, President Lyndon B Johnson continued the executive efforts for the Wilderness Act to be passed. During a press conference on June 23, 1963 President Johnson included the Wilderness Act as a pieces of legislation needed to be passed in his list of 30 "musts." After going to a conference committee to resolve differences between the House and Senate versions of the bill, the Act eventually was eventually signed into law by President Johnson on September 3, 1964.

Legal framework 
The Wilderness Act of 1964 included a few provisions (sections), that covered different aspects its implementation.

Definition of a Wilderness 
Section 2 of the Wilderness Act provides a justification for and definition of what constitutes an area of land as wilderness.

Wilderness Act land is chosen from existing federal land and by determining which areas are considered to meet the following criteria:
 Minimal human imprint
 Opportunities for unconfined recreation
 At least five thousand acres
 Educational, scientific, scenic or historical value
 Have no commercial enterprises within them or any motorized travel or other form of mechanical transport (e.g., vehicles, motorcycles, bicycles).

Creation of the National Wilderness Preservation System 
Section 3 of the Act outlines the creation and regulation of the National Wilderness Preservation System (NWPS).

When Congress designates each wilderness area, it includes a very specific boundary line in statutory law. Once a wilderness area has been added to the system, its protection and boundary can be altered only by Congress. The basics of the NWPS set out in the Wilderness Act are straightforward:

The lands protected as wilderness are areas of our public lands.
Wilderness designation is a protective overlay Congress applies to selected portions of national forests, parks, wildlife refuges,  and other public lands.
Within wilderness areas, the Wilderness Act strives to restrain human influences so that ecosystems [the Wilderness Act, however, makes no specific mention of ecosystems] can change over time in their own way, free, as much as possible, from human manipulation. In these areas, as the Wilderness Act puts it, "the earth and its community of life are untrammeled by man," untrammeled meaning that the forces of nature operate unrestrained and unaltered.
Wilderness areas serve multiple uses but the law limits uses to those consistent with the Wilderness Act mandate that each wilderness area be administered to preserve the "wilderness character of the area." For example, these areas protect watersheds and clean-water supplies vital to downstream municipalities and agriculture, as well as habitats supporting diverse wildlife, including endangered species, but logging and oil and gas drilling are prohibited.
Along with many other uses for the American people, wilderness areas are popular for diverse kinds of outdoor recreation but without motorized or mechanical vehicles or equipment except where specifically permitted. Scientific research is also allowed in wilderness areas as long as it is non-invasive.
The Wilderness Act allows certain uses (resource extraction, grazing, etc.) that existed before the land became wilderness to be grandfathered in and so they may continue to take place although the area that was designated as wilderness typically would not concede such uses. Specifically, mining, grazing, water uses, or any other uses that do not significantly impact the majority of the area may remain in some degree.

Land use regulations 
Section 4 lists what usage is not allowed on land protected by the NWPS, and define the exceptions to the rules.

Prohibited actions include:

 Use of a motor vehicle, equipment, motorboat. or any other mechanical transport
 Creation of a permanent or temporary road
 Inclusion of a commercial enterprise
 Aircraft landing

Expansion of the program 
Sections 5, 6, and 7 discuss how Congress shall handle acquisition of more land, gifts, and addition of new designated wilderness areas.

Uncertainties 
Some topics surrounding the Act remained unanswered, which has prompted future actions and controversies.

When the Wilderness Act was passed, it ignored lands managed by the Bureau of Land Management because of uncertainty of policy makers surrounding the future of those areas. The uncertainty was clarified in 1976 with the passing of the Federal Land Policy and Management Act, which stated that land managed by the Bureau of Land Management would remain federally owned and, between March 1978 and November 1980, would be reviewed to possibly be classified as wilderness.

Some argue that the criteria to determine wilderness are vague and open to interpretation. For example, one criterion for wilderness is that it be roadless, and the act does not define the term roadless. Wilderness advocacy groups and some agency staff have attempted to use this standard: "the word 'roadless' refers to the absence of roads that have been improved and maintained by mechanical means." For more information, see Revised Statute 2477.

The Wilderness Act has been interpreted by the administrating agencies to ban bicycles from wilderness areas based on the statutory text prohibiting "other mechanical forms of transport." It is noteworthy that mountain bikes did not exist when the Wilderness Act was enacted, hence they were not explicitly identified in the statute. The prohibition on bicycles has led to opposition from mountain bikers to the opening of new wilderness areas.

Creation 
The pioneering research and advocacy work of Margaret and Olaus Murie and Celia Hunter, along with the Alaska Conservation Society, was crucial to the passage of the Wilderness Act, and to the creation of the Arctic National Wildlife Refuge. Margaret Murie testified passionately before Congress in favor of the Wilderness Act. Margaret worked with Wilderness Society staffer Howard Zahniser, author of the bill, to promote passage of the act, and she attended the signing ceremony.

Statistics 
As of 2014, the National Wilderness Preservation System comprised over 109 million acres (441,000 km²), involving federal lands administered by four agencies:

Subsequent legislation 
The Wilderness Act has created a foundation that allows for many new additions of American land to be designated as wilderness. Congress considers additional proposals every year, some recommended by federal agencies and many proposed by grassroots conservation and sportsmen's organizations. Additional laws adding areas to the NWPS include:

 Eastern Wilderness Areas Act of 1975
 Boundary Waters Canoe Area Wilderness Act of 1978
 Endangered American Wilderness Act of 1978
 Great Bear Wilderness Act of 1978
 Alaska National Interest Lands Conservation Act of 1980
 National Forest Wilderness Act of 1980
 New Mexico Wilderness Act of 1980
 Vermont Wilderness Act of 1984
 New Hampshire Wilderness Act of 1984
 California Wilderness Act of 1984
 Oregon Wilderness Act of 1984
 Arizona Wilderness Act 1984
 North Carolina Wilderness Act of 1984
 Colorado Wilderness Act of 1993
 Northern California Coastal Wild Heritage Wilderness Act of 2006
 New England Wilderness Act of 2006
 Omnibus Public Land Management Act of 2009
 Sleeping Bear Dunes National Lakeshore Conservation and Recreation Act of 2014
 John D. Dingell Jr. Conservation, Management, and Recreation Act of 2019

Congressional bills are pending to designate new wilderness areas in Utah, Colorado, Washington, California, Virginia, Idaho, West Virginia, Montana and New Hampshire. Grassroots coalitions are working with local congressional delegations on legislative proposals for additional wilderness areas, including Vermont, southern Arizona, national grasslands in South Dakota, Rocky Mountain peaks of Montana, Colorado and Wyoming.  The U.S. Forest Service has recommended new wilderness designations, which citizen groups may propose to expand.

50th anniversary of Wilderness Act 
In 2014, America celebrated "50 Years of Wilderness", and Wilderness50, a growing coalition of federal agencies, non-profit organizations, academic institutions, and other wilderness user groups has been created to document this historical commemoration honoring America's "True American Legacy of Wilderness."

A series of projects and events were held to commemorate the 50th year of the Wilderness Act, including community museum, airport and visitor center displays; National website and social media campaign; Smithsonian photography exhibition; Washington D.C. Wilderness Week in September, and the National Wilderness Conference.

See also 
 List of U.S. Wilderness Areas
 Conservation refugee
 Natural heritage
 National Wilderness Preservation System

References

Notes

Bibliography 
 Dant, Sara. "Making Wilderness Work: Frank Church and the American Wilderness Movement." Pacific Historical Review 77 (May 2008): 237-272.
 
 "The Wilderness Act of 1964."  
 "Conducting Wilderness Characteristics Inventory on BLM Lands", 15 March 2012

External links 
 The Wilderness Society (political advocacy)
 50th Anniversary of Wilderness Act Commemoration Events
 50th Anniversary of Wilderness Act Hub
 Listen to President Johnson's remarks at the signing of the Wilderness Act on September 3, 1964
 [ Full text of the Wilderness Act]
 
 Overview of other wilderness-related legislation 
 Campaign for America's Wilderness (political advocacy)
 Californians for Western Wilderness (political advocacy)
 America's Redrock Wilderness Act  - Library of Congress

88th United States Congress
Protected areas of the United States
United States federal public land legislation
Act
Environmental law in the United States